Olios argelasius is a species of huntsman spider found in the Mediterranean Basin. It was first described by Charles Athanase Walckenaer in 1805.

References

Sparassidae
Spiders of Europe
Spiders of Africa
Spiders described in 1805